Nagaon is a town and a municipal board in Nagaon district in the Indian state of Assam.

History
This division was organised on the both banks of Kalang river by Momai Tamuli Borbarua in 1611 during the reign of Pratap Singha. Its settlement was completed during the reign of Gadadhar Singha. Nagoan was under the administration of the Borphukan. From Nagoan 1,310 soldiers took part in the Kachari invasion of Swargadeo Rudra Singha in 1707

Geography
The Kolong River, a tributary of the Brahmaputra River, flows through Nagaon and in the process divides the city into two distinct regions: Nagaon and Haibargaon.

Nagaon is bounded on the north by the Sonitpur district and the Brahmaputra River. On the south, it borders the West Karbi Anglong district, Dima Hasao and Hojai District. On the east it is bounded by East Karbi Anglong district and the Golaghat district, while on the west it neighbours the Marigaon district.

There are several beels, marshy areas and swamps in the district, including the regions of Marikalong, Potakalong, Haribhanga, Jongalbalahu, Samaguri Beel, Gatanga Beel Urigadang and Nawbhanga. These wetlands are former channels of the Kolong and Kopili rivers.

Transport

Road
There is very good availability of buses playing from Guwahati, Jorhat and Tezpur to Nagaon, There is flexibility of timings. Plenty of government and private buses travel between Guwahati and Nagaon. The district lies about 120 km east of Guwahati with an average travel time of 2 hours. Nagaon is round 190 km from Jorhat and 75 km from Tezpur. Taxies are available for hire from all major destinations to Nagaon.

Railway
There are two railway stations in Nagaon town, one at Haibargaon (Dhing gate) and another at Nagaon. The nearest railway junction is at Chaparmukh, which is around 28 km from Nagaon.

Airport
The nearest airport is Tezpur Airport. The nearest international airport is Lokpriya Gopinath Bordoloi International Airport in Guwahati.

Demographics

 India census, Nagaon  city had a population of 155,889 making it one of the largest cities of Assam. The population is largely of heterogeneous nature. Indigenous Assamese communities along with tribal communities like Karbi, Tiwa (Lalung) are the natives of the city. Assamese is spoken by 70,039 people, Bengali is spoken by 33,978, Hindi is spoken by 15,926 people and 35,946 speaks others languages.

Politics
Nagaon is part of the Lok Sabha constituency of Nowgong. Rupak Sarmah of BJP is the current MLA of Nowgong (Vidhan Sabha constituency).

Pradyut Bordoloi of Indian National Congress is the current MP of Nowgong (Lok Sabha constituency).

Education

Modern education  was first introduced in the district  by Christian missionaries, such as Miles Bronson and Nathan Brown in the nineteenth century. Anandaram Dhekial Phukan, a major figure in Assamese literature, spent the better part of his life in Nagaon, and the Assamese intellectual Gunabhiram Barua worked in Nagaon for about two decades.

Schools
The Nowgong Mission High School, established by Miles Bronson in 1846 is one of the oldest school in Assam. It also has the third oldest government school in Assam, the Nowgong Government Boys' Higher Secondary School, established in 1865. Another old school is the Dawson Higher Secondary & Multipurpose School.

Prominent English Medium Schools:

 Kendriya Vidyalaya, Nagaon
 Christ Jyoti School
 Nowgong Mission High School
 St. Ignatius Loyola English Medium High School
 St. Antony's High School
 Little Flower School
 Model English School
 Nagaon English Academy
 Sandipani Vidyamandir
 St. Boniface High School
 Riverdale School
School having both English and Assamese medium
 Ramanujan Secondary School
Other Schools of Repute:
 Nagaon Shankardev Vidya Niketon
 National Academy Nagaon
 Nowgong Government Boys' Higher Secondary School
 Nowgong Government Girls' Higher Secondary School
 Nagaon Bengali Boys' Higher Secondary School
 Nagaon Bengali Girls' Higher Secondary School
 Government Urban Basic School
 Dawson Higher Secondary and Multipurpose School
 Om Prakash Jajodia Girls' Hindi High School
 Marwari Hindi high School
 Nabarup Jatiya Vidyapith
Navaroop jatiya vidyapith
Haibargaon Adarsha High Schooll

Colleges
At present, there are about 25 colleges, of which probably the most renowned are

Nowgong College
 A.D.P. College (named after Anandaram Dhekial Phookan)
 Khagarijan College (named after the old administrative headquarters of Nowgong District)
 Nowgong Girls' College
Nowgong Law College
 Nagaon G.N.D.G. Commerce College
Pioneer Arts College
 College of Education, Nagaon

Besides these there are a number of junior colleges that have sprung up in Nagaon. As such many students from the neighboring districts also come to study in these colleges. Some of these are

Ramanujan Junior College
Concept Junior College
 Geetanjali Junior College (regarded as the best college for Commerce Department) 
 Renaissance Junior College
 Alpha Beta College (Jr.)
Kalong-Kapili Vidyapith Junior College
 Kalongpar Vidyapith Junior College
Bharali's Academy Junior College
Nagaon Junior College
Srimanta Sankardev Junior College
Madhabdev Junior College
Dronacharya Junior College
Chanakya Junior College
Matrix Junior College
 Dimension Junior College
Gyanpith Junior College
CV Raman Junior College
Dr. S.R.K. Junior College
Anandaram Baruah Junior College
Kamala Kanta Barua Junior College
Nonoi Junior college
Abhigyan Junior college
Daswani Classes (Domain Academy)

Assam Homeopathic Medical College and Hospital
The Assam Homeopathic College is situated in Haibargaon, Nagaon. The institute was established in the year 1968. It is the first homeopathic medical college of the entire North East India.

Nowgong Polytechnic

Nagaon is also home to Nowgong Polytechnic, one of the oldest technical education institutes in Assam.

Nagaon also has an ITI at Panigaon.

The College of Fisheries
The College of Fisheries, the only college of its kind in the entire northeastern India, is located in Raha and comes under the academic management of Assam Agricultural University in Jorhat.

The Nagaon Medical College
The foundation stone of the Nagaon Medical College was laid by the then chief minister of Assam Mr. Tarun Gogoi in February 2016. The construction work on the same has officially begun from 18 February 2017 and the college will be ready for operation in 3 years time.

University
Nagaon is home to the Mahapurusha Srimanta Sankaradeva Viswavidyalaya, which offers postgraduate and doctorate level courses.

Important Localities

Bordowa
Puranigudam
Dhing Gate
Haibargaon
Santipur
Laokhowa Road
Chandmari Road
Samaddar Patty
Bara Bazar
Daccapatty
Natun Bazar
Lakhinagar
Juria
Itachali
Christian Patty
Panigaon
Amolapatty
Mukut Sharma Chariali
Bengali Patty
Fauzdari Patty
Chinapatty
Morikolong
Kachulukhuwa
Khutikatia
Lakhinagar
Tarun Phukan Road
Senchowa
Prem Nagar
Dimaruguri
Uriya Gaon
Borghat
Chokitup
Moukhuli
Dipholu
Hatichung
Jajori
Maj Jajori
Dhing
Dakshinpat
Pathori
Nonoi
Rupahi

Notable people

 Dev Kant Baruah, politician
 Lakshminath Bezbaroa, poet, novelist and writer
 Jatin Bora, actor
 Lakshmi Nandan Bora, novelist
 Mahim Bora, writer
 Mayur Bora, writer
 Bharat Ratna Gopinath Bordoloi, First Chief Minister of Assam
 Pradyut Bordoloi, Former Cabinet Minister, Lok Sabha MP from Nowgong Lok Sabha constituency
 Hima Das, athlete
 Pabitra Kumar Deka, journalist and humor writer
 Rashmi Desai, actress
 Rakibul Hussain, politician, former cabinet minister
 Khagen Mahanta, singer
 Prafulla Kumar Mahanta, Politician, Former Chief Minister of Assam
 Papon, singer, musician
 Bhabendra Nath Saikia, writer, director and editor
 Srimanta Sankardev, Saint
 Parveen Sultana, classical singer.

Sports
The multipurpose Nurul Amin Stadium of Nagaon is named after the sportsperson late Nurul Amin. It hosts the famous Independence Day Cup Football tournament every year in August and September, in which most of the teams of national repute participate. Different sports like cricket, hockey, kabaddi etc. are also played in this stadium, and sports training programs are also held here.

Hima Das who is an Indian sprinter and the first Indian athlete to win a gold medal in a track event at the IAAF World U20 Championships was born in Dhing, a town in Nagaon.

Photo Gallery

See also
Dabaka
Hojai
Kaliabor

References

External links

 
Cities and towns in Nagaon district
Year of establishment missing